Radvaň nad Dunajom is a municipality at the Danube in the Komárno District of the Nitra Region in Slovakia.

Etymology
The name is derived from the Slavic personal name Radovan.

History
In the 9th century, the territory of Radvaň nad Dunajom became part of the Kingdom of Hungary.
It was first mentioned as a village in 1260. The 1606 Peace of Zsitvatorok was signed in Žitavská Tôň, a small settlement near or identical with Žitava, which is now part of Radvaň nad Dunajom. After the Austro-Hungarian army disintegrated in November 1918, Czechoslovak troops occupied the area, later acknowledged internationally by the Treaty of Trianon. Between 1938 and 1945 Radvaň nad Dunajom once more  became part of Miklós Horthy's Hungary through the First Vienna Award. From 1945 until the Velvet Divorce, it was part of Czechoslovakia. Since then it has been part of Slovakia.

Demographics
According to the census of 2001, the municipality has 91.46% Hungarian majority and 7.99% Slovak minority.

References

Villages and municipalities in the Komárno District
Populated places on the Danube
Hungarian communities in Slovakia